Carlos Cesar Ocampo Manriquez (born 9 November 1995) is a Mexican professional boxer who challenged for the IBF welterweight title in 2018.

Amateur career

As an amateur, he won silver medals in the 2009 and 2011 Mexican National Olympiads.

Professional career

He made his professional debut in July 2012. Ocampo has won his first 21 pro bouts, with wins over the likes of Jorge Páez Jr. and former world title challenger Charlie Navarro. In July 2017, the IBF ordered a title eliminator between Ocampo and Konstantin Ponomarev. The winner will be the mandatory challenger to IBF champion Errol Spence Jr. The fight was later called off as Ponomarev pulled out for undisclosed reasons.

Professional boxing record

References

External links

1995 births
Living people
Mexican male boxers
Boxers from Baja California
People from Ensenada, Baja California
Welterweight boxers
Light-middleweight boxers